The 2018 Delaware Attorney General election took place on November 6, 2018. The Delaware primary election for federal and state candidates took place on September 6, 2018. Incumbent Attorney General Matthew Denn announced on August 28, 2017, that he would not seek re-election.

Democratic primary

Candidates

Nominee
 Kathy Jennings, former New Castle County chief administrative officer

Eliminated in primary
 Chris Johnson, former counsel for the City of Wilmington Law Department
 Tim Mullaney, former chief of staff for the Delaware Department of Justice
 LaKresha Roberts, former Delaware Chief Deputy Attorney General

Declined
 Matthew Denn, incumbent state Attorney General

Endorsements

Results

Republican primary

Candidates

Nominee
 Bernard Pepukayi, former New Castle County attorney

Withdrawn nomination
 Peggy Marshall Thomas, former chief Sussex County prosecutor

Withdrew
 Tom Neuberger, lawyer

Independents

Candidates

Declared
 Allen Jester (write-in)

General election

Endorsements

Results

References

External links
Official campaign websites
 Kathy Jennings (D) for Attorney General 
 Chris Johnson (D) for Attorney General 
 LaKresha Roberts (D) for Attorney General
 Peggy Marshall Thomas (R) for Attorney General

attorney general
Delaware
Delaware Attorney General elections